The 1975 Family Circle Cup was a women's tennis tournament played on outdoor clay courts at the Amelia Island Plantation in Amelia Island, Florida in the United States. The event was part of the 1975 WTA Tour. It was the third edition of the tournament and was held from April 21 through April 27, 1975. First-seeded Chris Evert won the singles title, her second consecutive title at the event, and earned $25,000 first-prize money.

Finals

Singles
 Chris Evert defeated  Martina Navratilova 7–5, 6–4
 It was Evert's 6th singles title of the year and the 45th of her career.

Doubles
 Evonne Goolagong /  Virginia Wade defeated  Rosemary Casals /  Olga Morozova 4–6, 6–4, 6–2

See also
 Evert–Navratilova rivalry

References

External links
 Women's Tennis Association (WTA) tournament details

Family Circle Cup
Family Circle Cup
Charleston Open
Family Circle Cup
Family Circle Cup